Dorothy Drew was a vaudeville actress who was rumored to have married James J. Jeffries in November 1900. At this time Drew was featured in "The Young Plumber", a comedy at Poli's Vaudeville, in New Haven, Connecticut. Jeffries publicly denied proposing marriage to Drew on December 2, 1900.

A versatile talent, she was billed as a dancer during a performance at the Casino Roof Garden., in July 1896. On Ladies Day at the New Manhattan Athletic Club, Drew danced and sang songs, in January 1895.

References

External links
Dorothy Drew photo by J.U. Stead at the NYPL website

Vaudeville performers
19th-century American actresses
American stage actresses
Year of death missing
Year of birth missing